Chehel Zari (also Romanized as Chehel Zar‘ī and Chehel Zarī; also known as Chehel Gazī) is a village in Zarneh Rural District, Zarneh District, Eyvan County, Ilam Province, Iran. At the 2006 census, its population was 377, in 79 families. The village is populated by Kurds.

References 

Populated places in Eyvan County
Kurdish settlements in Ilam Province